The Tripartite Alliance is an alliance between the African National Congress (ANC), the Congress of South African Trade Unions (COSATU) and the South African Communist Party (SACP). The ANC holds a majority in the South African parliament, while the SACP and COSATU have not contested any democratic election in South Africa.

The Alliance was forged in 1990 after the release of Nelson Mandela. The movements were opposed to white minority rule by the apartheid government. The Tripartite Alliance is also known as the Revolutionary Alliance or just the Alliance.

Constituent parties
The NPF is currently composed of the following political parties:

See also 
 Congress Alliance

References

External links
The ANC now at a fork in the road
How the Tripartite Alliance works
COSATU and the Tripartite Alliance since 1994
The ideological differences within the Tripartite Alliance: What now for the left?
 Statement of the Alliance Political Council

 
Politics of South Africa
Popular fronts